Hardaker is a surname. Notable people with the surname include:

Alan Hardaker (1912–1980), English football administrator
Claire Hardaker (costume designer) (born ?), British costume designer
Claire Hardaker (linguist) (born 1981), English forensic and corpus linguist
Julie Hardaker (born 1960), New Zealand lawyer and mayor
Sara Hardaker (born 1975), British professional badminton player
Zak Hardaker (born 1991), English rugby league player